Arandaspis prionotolepis is an extinct species of jawless fish that lived in the Ordovician period, about 480 to 470 million years ago. Its remains were found in the Stairway Sandstone near Alice Springs, Australia in 1959, but it was not determined that they were the oldest known vertebrates until the late 1960s. Arandaspis is named after a local Aboriginal tribe, the Aranda (now currently called Arrernte).

Description
 
The front of the body and the head were protected by hard plates with openings for the eyes, nostrils and gills. It probably was a filter-feeder.

It had no fins; its only method of propulsion was the use of its vertically flattened tail. As a result, it probably swam in a fashion similar to a modern tadpole.

See also 
 Astraspis
 Sacabambaspis

References 

Pteraspidomorphi genera
Ordovician jawless fish
Prehistoric fish of Australia
Early Ordovician genus first appearances
Early Ordovician genus extinctions
Fossil taxa described in 1977